National Law College (NaLC) is a law school affiliated to Tribhuvan University, Nepal. Located in Lalitpur, the college runs both undergraduate and graduate law programs. The school offers a five-year B.A. LL.B program at undergraduate level and a two-year LL.M course at graduate level. Founded in 2012, the college enrolls 105 students in undergraduate level and 50 students in the graduate level. The motto of the college is "Ethical Legal Education with smile."

B.A LL.B. and LL.M. program
NaLC offers a five-year B.A. LL.B. at undergraduate level. The college used a yearly evaluation method for all the batches enrolling up to 2015. However, starting from 2015, as per university rules, the college started using semester system evaluation.

The first two years of the course consist of law and social science subjects. Starting in the third year, all the courses are legal subjects. Three seminar courses will be offered by professors in the third, fourth and fifth year. This same system has been carried forward to the semester evaluation system where.

The LL.M course runs for two years [four semesters] and has three compulsory subjects each semester. The college offers four optional subjects. The students choose at least two of the four optional courses that have been provided. Each course consists of 3 credit hours in total, with total of 15 credit hour in a semester.

Extracurricular activities
National Law College has taken part in the National Rounds of Henry Dunant Moot Court Competition and has reached the regional round multiple times. The college is also a regular participant of Philip C. Jessup International Law Moot Court Competition. The college has conducted social work research in remote areas of Nepal from 2013 to 2017 A.D. National Law College also conducts a legal drafting residential program with International Legal Foundation (ILF), Nepal.
The college has taken part and been a part of multiple inter-law college football tournaments with the ladies team winning 2016 edition of NLSC Inter-law college football tournament and the gents team coming in as runners-up. In the 2017 Edition of this tournament hosted by Rotract Club of Nepal, the gents team turned out to be the winner of the tournament.

Library
The library has more than 10,000 books. In addition, it also has digital library system accessible from college premises containing more than 3000 books and periodicals.

Publication and research
National Law College publishes NaLC Law Journal annually. It also publishes NaLC e-journal in bi-monthly basis. National law college has set up different law research center viz. Civil Law research center, International Law and Human rights research Center, Constitutional Law Research center.

Management team
The Governing and Academic Body of NaLC consists of the following members:
 Dr. Surya Dhungel, PhD (Delhi University), more than 30 years of teaching experience, advisor to the President of Nepal
 Prof. Pawan Kumar Ojha, LL.M (Pune University), former attorney General, former Supreme Court Justice
 Dr. Ram Krishna Timalsena, PhD (Delhi University), Master in Political Science(TU), former Registrar of the Supreme Court of Nepal
 Puspa Pokharel, LL.M (Northwestern University), director-administrator (Research and Development Department)
 Rastra Bimochan Timalsena B.A. LL.B (Hons.) (National Law School of India University), LLM (Tribhuwan University), Deputy Director (Research and Development Department)
 Hark Rawal, LL.M. (Tribhuwan University), co-ordinator (LL.M)
 Sharada Poudel LL.M (Tribhuwan University), co-ordinator (B.A LL.B.)
 Basanta Phuyal (Tribhuwan University), co-ordinator (B.A LL.B.)

Advisory board
 Prof. Dr. M.P. Singh, Constitutional Law Professor, National Law University, Delhi.
 Prof. Dr. Upendra Dev Acharya, Professor of Law. Gonzaga University School of Law. 721 N. Cincinnati. Spokane, WA 99220-3528.
 Prof. Dr. Khushal Vibute, Professor of Criminal Law, Rajiv Gandhi School of Intellectual Property Law and IIT Kharagpur

References

Nepal, National Law College
Tribhuvan University
2012 establishments in Nepal